Wolfgang Trödler is a German middleweight boxer who won the bronze medals at the 1965 European Amateur Boxing Championships. He contended for the SC Dynamo Berlin / Sportvereinigung (SV) Dynamo.

References

Middleweight boxers
Living people
German male boxers
Year of birth missing (living people)